Basque Uruguayans are citizens of Uruguay who are of Basque ancestry.

Although this figure does not imply Basque descent for each individual, it is estimated that up to 10% of Uruguay's population has at least one parent with a Basque surname. The first wave of Basque immigrants to Uruguay came from the French side of the Basque country beginning about 1824.

Notable people
Past

Present

See also

 Basque diaspora
 Basque Argentine
 Immigration to Uruguay

References

External links
 
 

Uruguayan
European Uruguayan
Spanish diaspora
French immigration to Uruguay
Ethnic groups in Uruguay
Immigration to Uruguay